The Jeanne Sauvé Memorial Cup is Canada's premier ringette championship trophy which is awarded annually to the winning team in the National Ringette League (NRL) at the Canadian Ringette Championships (CRC). The trophy is named after the first female Governor General of Canada, Jeanne Sauvé .

Prior to the creation of the NRL the trophy was called the "Jeanne Sauvé Cup" and was awarded to the winning 18+ ringette team at the Canadian Ringette Championships. The trophy was renamed after the death of Jeanne Sauvé.

History
The Jeanne Sauvé Memorial Cup was established by Betty Shields, the fifth President of Ringette Canada, and was named after Jeanne Sauvé, Canada's first female Governor General. Initially coined the "Jeanne Sauvé Cup", and initiated in December 1984, it was first presented at the 1985 Canadian Ringette Championships in Dollard-des-Ormeaux, Québec. It is now entitled the "Jeanne Sauvé Memorial Cup", in memory of the late Governor General of Canada.

On April 15, 1985, the Transcona Tempos ringette team from Winnipeg, Manitoba, were competing in what was then called the "Debs" age group (18-and-over) and became the first team to win the Jeanne Sauvé Cup.

See also
 List of sports awards honouring women
 Sam Jacks
 Stanley Cup

References 

Ringette
National Ringette League
Sports awards honoring women
Canadian sports trophies and awards